The Young Person's Guide to the Orchestra, Op. 34, is a 1945 musical composition by Benjamin Britten with a subtitle Variations and Fugue on a Theme of Purcell. It was based on the second movement, "Rondeau", of the Abdelazer suite. It was originally commissioned for the British educational documentary film called Instruments of the Orchestra released on 29 November 1946, directed by Muir Mathieson and featuring the London Symphony Orchestra conducted by Malcolm Sargent; Sargent also conducted the concert première on 15 October 1946 with the Liverpool Philharmonic in the Philharmonic Hall, Liverpool, England.

The work is one of the best-known pieces by the composer, and is often associated with two other works in music history: Saint-Saëns' The Carnival of the Animals and Prokofiev's Peter and the Wolf. This piece is also commonly played as the intro for british band Yes' live tours, starting in the 2000s.

Instrumentation
The Young Person's Guide to the Orchestra is scored for symphony orchestra:

Woodwinds: piccolo, two flutes, two oboes, two clarinets in B flat and A and two bassoons
Brass: four horns in F, two trumpets in C, three trombones (two tenors and one bass) and bass tuba
Percussion: timpani, bass drum, cymbals, tambourine, triangle, snare drum, temple blocks, xylophone, castanets, tamtam, and whip
Strings: harp, first and second violin, viola, cello, and double bass.

Structure
The work is based on the Rondeau from Henry Purcell's incidental music to Aphra Behn's Abdelazer, and is structured, in accordance with the plan of the original documentary film, as a way of showing off the tone colours and capacities of the various sections of the orchestra.

In the introduction, the theme is initially played by the entire orchestra, then by each major family of instruments of the orchestra: first the woodwinds, then the strings, then the brass, and finally by the percussion. Each variation then features a particular instrument in-depth, generally moving through each family from the higher-pitched instruments to the lower-pitched (the order of the families is slightly different from the introduction). For example, the first variation features the piccolo and flutes; each member of the woodwind family then gets a variation, ending with the bassoon. The woodwinds are followed by the strings, brass, and finally the percussion.

After the whole orchestra has been taken apart in this way, it is reassembled using an original fugue which starts with the piccolo, followed by all the woodwinds, strings, brass and percussion in turn. Once everyone has entered, the brass are re-introduced (with a strike on the tamtam) with Purcell's original melody.

The sections of the piece and instruments introduced by the variations are as follows.

Theme Allegro maestoso e largamente
Tutti (D minor), woodwinds (F major), brass (E♭ major), strings (G minor), then percussion (written in A major)
Variation A Presto
Flutes and piccolo
Variation B Lento
Oboes
Variation C Moderato
Clarinets
Variation D Allegro alla marcia
Bassoons
Variation E Brillante: alla polacca
Violins
Variation F Meno mosso
Violas
Variation G Lusingando
Cellos
Variation H Cominciando lento ma poco a poco accel. al Allegro
Double basses
Variation I Maestoso
Harp
Variation J L'istesso tempo
Horns
Variation K Vivace
Trumpets
Variation L Allegro pomposo
Trombones and tuba
Variation M Moderato
Percussion (timpani; bass drum and cymbals; tambourine and triangle; snare drum and woodblock; xylophone; castanets and tam-tam; whip; percussion tutti)
Fugue Allegro molto

Narration
The narration for the documentary film was written by Eric Crozier, the producer of the first production of Britten's opera Peter Grimes,  and is sometimes spoken by the conductor or a separate speaker during performance of the piece. The composer also arranged a version without narration. The one without narration is more often recorded. The commentary often differs among recordings.

A new narration was written by Simon Butteriss for the Aldeburgh Festival and broadcast live by CBBC presenter Johny Pitts with the BBC Symphony Orchestra for the Britten 100 celebrations in 2013.

Comedian and author John Hodgman wrote a new narration of The Young Person's Guide to the Orchestra in 2015 for a series of performances with the Boston Pops Orchestra.

Jazz orchestra versions
Duncan Lamont wrote an equivalent suite of variations (using the same Purcell theme) for jazz orchestra and narrator, The Young Person’s Guide to the Jazz Orchestra. Mike Westbrook's After Smith's Hotel, subtitled The Young Person’s Guide To The Jazz Orchestra, was commissioned by the Snape Maltings Foundation and performed there in October 1983.

See also
 List of variations on a theme by another composer

References

Further reading
 Boosey & Hawkes No. 606. Benjamin Britten – The Young Person's Guide to the Orchestra, Opus 34
 History of the London Symphony Orchestra on Film

External links
 Animated guide presented by Carnegie Hall
 BBC Radio 4 programme about the piece and the score manuscript

Compositions by Benjamin Britten
Variations
1945 compositions
Compositions for symphony orchestra
Compositions with a narrator
Children's music
Music education